Novak Djokovic defeated Nikolay Davydenko in the final, 6–1, 7–5 to win the singles tennis title at the 2008 Tennis Masters Cup. It was his first Tour Finals title, and the first of an eventual joint-record six such titles.

Roger Federer was the two-time defending champion, but was eliminated in the round-robin stage. This marked the only time in his career that he was eliminated before the semifinals.

Rafael Nadal qualified as the world No. 1, but withdrew before the tournament with a knee injury.

Future champion Andy Murray made his tournament debut; he was defeated by Davydenko in the semifinals.

Seeds

Alternates

Draw

Finals

Red group
Standings are determined by: 1. number of wins; 2. number of matches; 3. in two-players-ties, head-to-head records; 4. in three-players-ties, percentage of sets won, or of games won; 5. steering-committee decision.

Gold group
Standings are determined by: 1. number of wins; 2. number of matches; 3. in two-players-ties, head-to-head records; 4. in three-players-ties, percentage of sets won, or of games won; 5. steering-committee decision.

See also
ATP World Tour Finals appearances

External links
Draw

Singles